The 1977 Central American and Caribbean Championships in Athletics were held at the Estadio Heriberto Jara Corona in Xalapa, Mexico between 5–7 August.

Medal summary

Men's events

Women's events

A = affected by altitude

Medal table

References
Men Results – GBR Athletics
Women Results – GBR Athletics

Central American and Caribbean Championships in Athletics
Central American and Caribbean Championships
Sport in Xalapa
Athletics
International athletics competitions hosted by Mexico
1977 in Mexican sports